Salt Lake Lutheran High School was a Lutheran school founded in 1984 and located until 2011 in Salt Lake City, Utah, United States.  In 2011 the school moved to Riverton, Utah, and took the name Concordia Preparatory School. It closed in 2013.

Education
The school taught students in grades 7–12. It was accredited by the Northwest Accreditation Commission. In addition to undertaking a full high school curriculum, students were required to attend chapel weekly.

History
Owned by a coalition of Lutheran churches in the Salt Lake City area, the school was founded in 1984.  Originally housed in St. John's Lutheran Church in Salt Lake City's Liberty Park neighborhood, the school acquired its own site on South 900 East in 1993. For the floor of its new gymnasium, the school acquired the former basketball court of the old Salt Palace arena, which was being demolished and replaced.

In 2011 the school moved to a 56,000 square foot, 10 acre facility in Riverton and changed its name to Concordia Preparatory School.  The school closed on June 30, 2013.

Sports
Sports teams were known as 'Lynx'.

References

Further reading
 "A Witness among Mormons", Lutheran Church–Missouri Synod, September 15, 2012.

Private high schools in Utah
Defunct Lutheran schools
Schools in Salt Lake City
Educational institutions established in 1964
Educational institutions disestablished in 2013
2013 disestablishments in Utah
Secondary schools affiliated with the Lutheran Church–Missouri Synod
1964 establishments in Utah
Defunct Christian schools in the United States